Orma (before 1925: Τρέσινον - Tresinon) is a village in Pella regional unit, Macedonia, Greece.

Orma had 685 inhabitants in 1981. In fieldwork done by Riki Van Boeschoten in late 1993, Orma was populated by Slavophones. The Macedonian language was spoken in the village by people over 30 in public and private settings. Children understood the language, but mostly did not use it.

References

Populated places in Pella (regional unit)